Jorge Bryan Díaz (born November 13, 1989) is a Puerto Rican professional basketball player for Atléticos de San Germán of the Baloncesto Superior Nacional (BSN). He also represents the Puerto Rican national team.

Early years 
Jorge Bryan Díaz was born in Bronx, N.Y., USA to a Puerto Rican mother, Nilda Hernandez, and an Ecuatorian father, Jorge Diaz. He has one sister, Natalie Diaz. When he was 4 years old his family moved to Caguas, Puerto Rico. He played in High School with Colegio Bautista de Caguas for Coach Leonel Arill. He averaged about 17 points, 10 rebounds and three blocked shots per game in 2007-08 under Arill, who helped Diaz and the Caguas team to a national title in 2006. Diaz has also played on the Puerto Rican Under-19 National Team, traveling to many international tournaments, including playing in Serbia in 2007, where he was first seen by the Nebraska coaching staff.

On January 17, 2009, he joined the Nebraska basketball team, the Nebraska Huskers where he also majored in Spanish. As a player, he has been battling foot injuries many times. For instance in 2012 as a Husker junior, he would have ranked second in the Big Ten in blocked shots per game, but did not play in enough games to qualify for league rankings because of said injuries.

International career
Díaz has participated in several FIBA tournaments representing Puerto Rico. At present, he is the tallest center of the Puerto Rico squad.

Career statistics

College

National team

See also

References

External links
 Jorge Díaz at espn.com
 Jorge Díaz at fiba.basketball
 Jorge Díaz at latinbasket.com

1989 births
Living people
Basketball players from New York City
Centers (basketball)
Central American and Caribbean Games gold medalists for Puerto Rico
Competitors at the 2018 Central American and Caribbean Games
Nebraska Cornhuskers men's basketball players
Piratas de Quebradillas players
Puerto Rican expatriate basketball people in Argentina
Puerto Rican men's basketball players
Sportspeople from the Bronx
2014 FIBA Basketball World Cup players
Central American and Caribbean Games medalists in basketball
Puerto Rican expatriate basketball people in Uruguay
Puerto Rican people of Ecuadorian descent
American people of Ecuadorian descent
American sportspeople of Puerto Rican descent
American expatriate basketball people in Uruguay
American expatriate basketball people in Argentina